The surname McBride or MacBride is an anglicisation of the Gaelic Mac Giolla Bríghde (Irish) or Mac Gille Bríghde (Scottish), meaning son of the servant of Brigid or St. Brigid.  In Scotland, the MacBride Family is a sept of the MacDonald clan.

MacBride is the name of several persons:

 Anthony MacBride, Provisional IRA member killed in 1984
 John MacBride (born 1868), Irish republican
 John MacBride (Royal Navy officer)
 Maud Gonne MacBride, Irish republican and wife of John MacBride
 Roger MacBride, American lawyer, political figure, writer and television producer
 Seán MacBride, politician and son of John MacBride and Maud Gonne
 Stuart MacBride, Scottish writer

See also

 McBride
 McBride (disambiguation)
 McBryde (disambiguation)
 MacBryde